Sarcoxie is a city in Jasper County, Missouri, United States. The population was 1,406 at the 2020 census. It is part of the Joplin, Missouri Metropolitan Statistical Area.

History
Sarcoxie was platted in the early 1830s, and it was originally called Centerville from its location upon Center Creek. In 1839, the settlement was renamed in honor of Sarcoxie, a chief of the Delaware Indians who had settled near a spring in the present town limits.

Sarcoxie was once the strawberry capital of the world and still is the peony capital of the world, and home to Gilbert H. Wild, one of America's largest growers of daylilies, iris, and peonies. Sarcoxie once had its own currency that had a picture of a strawberry on one side.

During the start of the Civil War in 1861, Franz Sigel's independent command passed through Sarcoxie on June 28 before attempting to attack the separated commands of Sterling Price and Missouri Governor and General Claiborne Fox Jackson. Price was rumored to be at Pool's Prairie, moving to the Confederate forces in Northwest Arkansas.

The Cave Spring School and Cave Spring Cemetery and Sarcoxie Public Square Historic District are listed on the National Register of Historic Places listings in Jasper County, Missouri.

Geography
Sarcoxie is located at  (37.068490, -94.122450).

Demographics

2010 census
As of the census of 2010, there were 1,330 people, 526 households, and 350 families living in the city. The racial makeup of the city was 95.3% White, 0.2% African American, 1.4% Native American, 0.5% Asian, 0.1% Pacific Islander, 0.5% from other races, and 2.2% from two or more races. Hispanic or Latino of any race were 1.4% of the population.

There were 526 households, of which 34.0% had children under the age of 18 living with them, 47.1% were married couples living together, 13.7% had a female householder with no husband present, 5.7% had a male householder with no wife present, and 33.5% were non-families. 29.7% of all households were made up of individuals, and 12.6% had someone living alone who was 65 years of age or older. The average household size was 2.48 and the average family size was 3.01.

The median age in the city was 38.9 years. 26.9% of residents were under the age of 18; 6.9% were between the ages of 18 and 24; 24.5% were from 25 to 44; 24.4% were from 45 to 64; and 17.3% were 65 years of age or older. The gender makeup of the city was 47.2% male and 52.8% female.

2000 census
As of the census of 2000, there were 1,354 people, 559 households, and 359 families living in the city. The population density was 1,254.6 people per square mile (484.1/km). There were 635 housing units at an average density of 588.4 per square mile (227.0/km). The racial makeup of the city was 95.94% White, 0.07% African American, 0.96% Native American, 0.07% from other races, and 2.95% from two or more races. Hispanic or Latino of any race were 0.81% of the population.

There were 559 households, out of which 31.1% had children under the age of 18 living with them, 50.8% were married couples living together, 10.6% had a female householder with no husband present, and 35.6% were non-families. 32.0% of all households were made up of individuals, and 19.5% had someone living alone who was 65 years of age or older. The average household size was 2.36 and the average family size was 2.99.

In the city the population was spread out, with 26.4% under the age of 18, 7.9% from 18 to 24, 25.5% from 25 to 44, 19.3% from 45 to 64, and 20.9% who were 65 years of age or older. The median age was 36 years. For every 100 females, there were 80.8 males. For every 100 females age 18 and over, there were 75.0 males.

The median income for a household in the city was $25,000, and the median income for a family was $34,519. Males had a median income of $26,250 versus $20,547 for females. The per capita income for the city was $13,531. About 10.7% of families and 16.8% of the population were below the poverty line, including 21.3% of those under age 18 and 18.7% of those age 65 or over.

Education
Public education in Sarcoxie is administered by Sarcoxie R-II School District.

Sarcoxie has a lending library, the Sarcoxie Public Library.

Notable people
 G. Lloyd Spencer - US Senator for Arkansas.
 Gene Taylor - US House of Representatives

References

External links
 City of Sarcoxie
 Historic maps of Sarcoxie in the Sanborn Maps of Missouri Collection at the University of Missouri

Cities in Jasper County, Missouri
Joplin, Missouri, metropolitan area
Cities in Missouri